Alfredo Cristino Jara Mereles (born 2 May 1973, in Capiatá) is an association football forward from Paraguay, who is currently playing for Nacional Potosi in Bolivia. He was the topscorer in the Liga de Fútbol Profesional Boliviano 2006, scoring 35 goals (Apertura and Clausura). Jara previously played for Club 12 de Octubre, Marathón, Real Santa Cruz, Club Jorge Wilstermann, Oriente Petrolero, and Club Real Potosí.

References
 soccerway
 worldfootball
 larazon

1973 births
Living people
People from Capiatá
Paraguayan footballers
Paraguayan expatriate footballers
Association football forwards
Expatriate footballers in Bolivia
C.D. Jorge Wilstermann players
Oriente Petrolero players
Club Real Potosí players
Paraguayan expatriate sportspeople in Bolivia